Cleptometopus annulaticornis is a species of beetle in the family Cerambycidae. It was described by Matsushita in 1944.

References

annulaticornis
Beetles described in 1944